The 2018 Oklahoma State Cowboys football team represented Oklahoma State University in the 2018 NCAA Division I FBS football season. The Cowboys played their home games at the Boone Pickens Stadium in Stillwater, Oklahoma and competed in the Big 12 Conference. They were led by 14th-year head coach Mike Gundy. They finished the season 7–6, 3–6 in Big 12 play to finish tied for seventh. They were invited to the Liberty Bowl where they defeated #24 Missouri 38-33, ending the season with a 4-1 record against teams in the top 25.

Previous season
The Cowboys finished the 2017 season 10–3, 6–3 in Big 12 play to finish in third place. They were invited to the Camping World Bowl where they defeated Virginia Tech.

Preseason

Award watch lists
Listed in the order that they were released

Big 12 media poll
The Big 12 media poll was released on July 12, 2018, with the Cowboys predicted to finish in fifth place.

Schedule

Schedule Source:

Game summaries

Missouri State

South Alabama

Boise State

Texas Tech

at Kansas

Iowa State

Iowa State's Freshman Brock Purdy replaced Zeb Noland at quarterback and passed 18-for-23 for 318 yards and produced four touchdowns. He then ran for another 84 yards and another score.  The final score was a loss for the Cowboys at 48-42.

at Kansas State

The previous week loss against Iowa State put extra pressure on the Cowboys to win coming into the game against Kansas State.  Some of the issues the Cowboys bring in to the include lack of discipline, a disconnected defense, and a failure to force turnovers on defense.  The 2018 loss to Iowa State had many similarities to the 2017 game between Oklahoma State and Kansas State that resulted in a K-State victory 45-40.

Texas

at Baylor

Oklahoma

West Virginia

at TCU

vs. Missouri (Liberty Bowl)

Statistics

Scoring
Scores against non-conference opponents

Scores against the Big 12

Scores against all opponents

Rankings

Players drafted into the NFL

References

Oklahoma State
Oklahoma State Cowboys football seasons
Liberty Bowl champion seasons
Oklahoma State Cowboys football